The Griffith Institute is an Egyptological institution based in the Griffith Wing of the Sackler Library and is part of the Faculty of Oriental Studies, University of Oxford, England. It was founded for the advancement of Egyptology and Ancient Near Eastern Studies by the first Professor of Egyptology at the University of Oxford, Francis Llewellyn Griffith. Griffith bequeathed funds in his will (augmented by the personal fortune of his wife Nora Griffith) for the foundation of the Institute and it opened on 21 January 1939, with its own independent committee of management. Rosalind Moss operated the Griffith Institute from its opening until the mid-1960s.

The Griffith Institute Archive is home to an important and unique set of Egyptology resources. Built upon Griffith's original collection of manuscripts and excavation records, it contains and preserves early copies of inscriptions, drawings, watercolours, old negatives, photographs, squeezes, and rubbings.

Among some seventy major groups of material the Institute holds the papers of Sir Alan H. Gardiner, Battiscombe Gunn and Jaroslav Černý, records made by Howard Carter during his discovery of the tomb of Tutankhamun in 1922, as well as the documentation from the Nubian expeditions of Griffith and Sir Henry Wellcome.

The Institute edits and publishes two major research projects, the Topographical Bibliography of Ancient Egyptian Hieroglyphic Texts, Reliefs and Paintings, and the Online Egyptological Bibliography (OEB). It is also responsible for a number of important publications within the field of Egyptology, the best-known being Gardiner's Egyptian Grammar and Faulkner's A Concise Dictionary of Middle Egyptian.

Finally, the Griffith Institute administers the A.H. Gardiner Travel Scholarship in Egyptology, the aim of which is to promote friendship and cooperation between Egyptologists from the United Kingdom and the Arab Republic of Egypt.

An exhibition at the Ashmolean Museum in Oxford, Discovering Tutankhamun, open from July until November 2014, explored Howard Carter’s excavation of the tomb of Tutankhamun in 1922. Original records, drawings and photographs from the Griffith Institute were on display. The complete records of the ten-year excavation of the tomb of Tutankhamun were deposited in the Griffith Institute Archive at the University of Oxford shortly after Carter's death.

References

External links
 The Griffith Institute official website

1939 establishments in England
Scientific organizations established in 1939
Research institutes of the University of Oxford
Archives in Oxfordshire
Egyptological collections in England